Thelma Phillip-Browne (born Newtown, Basseterre, St Kitts) is the Ambassador to the United States from Saint Kitts and Nevis.

Early life
Phillip-Browne attended Girls High School and Basseterre High School before graduating with a medical degree from the University of the West Indies (UWI) in 1978. She attended Johns Hopkins Bloomberg School of Public Health and earned a Diploma in Dermatological Science from the Cardiff University School of Medicine. She obtained a Master of Theological Science (MTS) degree from Anderson University in 2011.

Career
Besides working as a dermatologist in private practice, she was Director of Primary Health Care and later Chief Medical Officer of the Federation of St Kitts and Nevis.

Personal life 
Phillip-Browne has served as a lay preacher and member of the Women of the Church of God. She has two daughters and one son, and has two granddaughters. She has seven siblings.

References

Women ambassadors
University of the West Indies alumni
Johns Hopkins Bloomberg School of Public Health alumni
Alumni of Cardiff University
Dermatologists
Ambassadors of Saint Kitts and Nevis to the United States
Year of birth missing (living people)
Living people